HMS Sceptre was an  destroyer of the Royal Navy, built by Alexander Stephen and Sons, at Linthouse (in Glasgow) and launched on 18 April 1917. In total 51 ships were in this class and saw service in World War I, entering service from 1916 to 1917 and suffering comparatively light losses. Sceptre saw action as part of the Harwich Force, operating mainly in the North Sea.  She survived the war and was sold for disposal in 1926.

Design and construction
The R-class was a further development of the M-class destroyer, which had been the last class of destroyers ordered for the Royal Navy before the start of the First World War, and had therefore been built in large numbers during the early years of the war.  The R-class differed by having geared rather than direct drive steam turbines, giving greater fuel efficiency while also carrying more fuel, having a higher forecastle for better seakeeping and a larger and more robust bridge structure.

Three Yarrow water-tube boilers fed steam to Brown-Curtis geared steam turbines which drove two propeller shafts.

The ships were armed with three 4-inch (102 mm) QF Mk IV guns, together with one 2-pounder pom-pom anti-aircraft autocannon. Two twin 21-inch (533mm) torpedo tubes were fitted. The ships had a crew of 82.

Sceptre was one of two Admiralty R-class destroyers ordered from the Scottish shipbuilder Alexander Stephen and Sons by the British Admiralty in May–July 1915 as part of the 
Sixth War Construction Programme. Sceptre was laid down at Stephen's Linthouse, Glasgow shipyard as yard number 478 on 10 November 1915. She was launched on 18 April 1917 and completed on 26 May 1917.

Service
On commissioning, Sceptre joined the 10th Destroyer Flotilla, attached to the Harwich Force. In October 1917, Sceptre formed part of a large-scale operation, involving 30 cruisers and 54 destroyers deployed in eight groups across the North Sea in an attempt to stop a suspected sortie by German naval forces in the North Sea. Sceptre remained part of the 10th Destroyer Flotilla at the end of the war.

Sceptre was still part of the 10th Flotilla in February 1919, but by March had transferred to the 5th Destroyer Flotilla. Sceptres status changed to having only a reduced complement on 15 October 1919. In December 1919, Sceptre was listed as a part of the local defence flotilla at Devonport with a "Home Fleet complement". Sceptre was sold to the shipbreaker Ward on 16 December 1926 for scrapping at their Briton Ferry yard.

Pennant numbers

Notes

Citations

Bibliography
 
 
 
 
 
 
 

 

R-class destroyers (1916)
Ships built on the River Clyde
1917 ships
World War I destroyers of the United Kingdom